Pamela Mather (born 1946) is an English former cricketer who played as a bowler. She appeared in five One Day Internationals for England in the 1973 Women's Cricket World Cup. She took two wickets at an average of 50.00 as England won the tournament. She played domestic cricket for East Anglia.

References

External links
 
 

Date of birth missing (living people)
Place of birth missing (living people)
1946 births
Living people
England women One Day International cricketers
East Anglia women cricketers